is a Japanese footballer currently playing as a centre back for Shonan Bellmare.

Club career
In mid-2021, it was announced that Matsumura would join J1 League side Shonan Bellmare ahead of the 2022 season. He is seen as a young player with the potential to represent Japan at international level.

Career statistics

Club
.

Notes

References

2003 births
Living people
Association football people from Niigata Prefecture
Japanese footballers
Association football defenders
J1 League players
Shonan Bellmare players